The Findlay Oilers are the athletic teams that represent the University of Findlay, located in Findlay, Ohio, in NCAA Division II intercollegiate sporting competitions. The Oilers currently compete as members of the  Great Midwest Athletic Conference. The Oilers were a member of the GLIAC since 1997, when they switched from the NAIA to the NCAA. Findlay sponsors 20 NCAA-sanctioned intercollegiate sports.

Varsity teams

List of teams

Men's sports (10)
Baseball
Basketball
Cross country
Football
Golf
Soccer
Swimming and diving
Tennis
Track and field
Wrestling

Women's sports (10)
Basketball
Cross country
Golf
Lacrosse
Soccer
Softball
Swimming and diving
Tennis
Track and field
Volleyball

Individual sports

National championships
 1979: Football – NAIA Division II
 1992: Football – NAIA Division II
 1995: Football – NAIA Division II
 1995: Wrestling – NAIA
 1997: Football – NAIA
 2001: Equestrian team (English) – IHSA
 2001: Equestrian team (Western) – IHSA
 2005: Equestrian team (Western) – IHSA
 2007: Equestrian team (Western) – IHSA
 2009: Equestrian team (Western) – IHSA
 2009: Men's Basketball – NCAA Division II National Championship Record 36–0
 2022: Women's Golf – NCAA Division II National Championship

Football

Conferences
1892–1920: Independent
1921–1932: Northwest Ohio League
1933: Independent
1934–1948: Ohio Athletic Conference
1949–1961: Mid-Ohio Conference
1962–1967: Independent
1971–1985: Hoosier-Buckeye Conference
1986–1993: NAIA Independent
1994–1997: Mid-States Football Association
1998: Midwest Intercollegiate Football Conference
1999–2017: Great Lakes Intercollegiate Athletic Conference
2017–present: Great Midwest Athletic Conference

References

External links